XHFF-FM is a radio station on 89.3 FM in Matehuala, San Luis Potosí. It carries a grupera format known as La Norteña.

History
XEFF-AM 1490 received its concession on January 15, 1953. It was owned by Arcelia Montemayor de Hernández and sold to Boone Menchaca in the 1960s. It moved to 980 in the 2000s and to FM in 2011.

References

Radio stations in San Luis Potosí